HD 86226 b is a gas giant exoplanet discovered by the Magellan Planet Search Program in 2010. It was confirmed in data collected by the CORALIE spectrograph on the Swiss 1.2-metre Leonhard Euler Telescope in 2012. It takes about 4.6 years to orbit its G-type star and was initially believed to have a minimal mass of 0.92 Jupiters. Discovery of the second planet in the system has led to the revised mass of HD 86226 b in 2020, now estimated to be 0.45.

References 

Exoplanets discovered in 2010
Exoplanets detected by radial velocity
Giant planets
Hydra (constellation)